Pyroneura toshikoae  is a butterfly of the family Hesperiidae. Its forewing length is 19–20 mm. It is endemic to the Philippines. It is very rare species and found only on eastern part of Mindanao Island.

References
 , 1980: New Hesperid Butterflies from Mindanao, the Philippines. Tyo-toGa. 30(3,4): 172-175.
 , 1993: The Hespriidae (Lepidoptera) of the Philippines. The Zoologische Verhandelingen. 288: 1-125.
 , 1955: Checklist of the butterflies of the Philippine Islands. Nachr. entomol. Ver. Apollo, Suppl. 14: 7-118.
 , 2008: Hesperiidae 1, Hesperiidae of the Philippine Islands. Butterflies of the world. 29: 1-15. pls. 1-39.
 , 2012: Revised checklist of the butterflies of the Philippine Islands (Lepidoptera: Rhopalocera). Nachr. entomol. Ver. Apollo, Suppl. 20: 1-64.

Butterflies described in 1980
Hesperiidae